The Intel P55 is the first desktop chipset from Intel based on the PCH chipset design. The P55 Express chipset uses the LGA 1156 socket. Compatible CPUs include the first generation Core i series i3, i5, and i7 processor line along with a Pentium G6950. Like any PCH chipset, the P55 uses a Direct Media Interface connection.

Features
 The chipset does not support onboard graphics.
 6 SATA 3 Gbit/s ports
 8 PCI-Express 2.0 lanes (bandwidth limited to 2.5 GT/s same as PCIe 1.0, normal PCIe 2.0 has 5 GT/s bandwidth)
 14 USB 2.0 ports
 Integrated LAN 10/100/1000
 SMBus 2.0
 Integrated clock chip buffer
 Intel HD Audio
 Intel AC'97 Technology
 Intel Rapid Storage Technology

See also
List of Intel chipsets
Intel 5 Series

References

External links
 Intel P55 Express Chipset Overview
 Intel P55 Express Chipset in ARK database

P55